Sweden women's national under-19 football team is the football team representing Sweden in competitions for under-19 year old players and is controlled by the Swedish Football Association. Their best achievement is winning the 1999, 2012 and 2015 UEFA Women's Under-19 Championship.

Competitive record

FIFA U-20 Women's World Cup

UEFA Women's Under-19 Championship
The first four editions (1998–2001) were held as under-18 championships. As of 2022, the Swedish team has participated in three UEFA Women's Under-18 Championships, having won one title in 1999, and ten UEFA Women's Under-19 Championships, having won two titles: the first in 2012 and the second in 2015.

Invitational competitions
 Albena Cup: won in 1992, 1995 (2)

Current squad
The following 24 players were named to the 2022 season squad. The 20 players with designated numbers were selected to represent Sweden at the 2022 UEFA Women's Under-19 Championship in June 2022.

Head coach: Caroline Sjöblom

Head coaches history
Marika Domanski Lyfors (1991–1993)
Pia Sundhage (199?–2000)
Anna Signeul (2001–2004)
Calle Barrling (2005–2017)
Anneli Andersén (2016)
Anders Johansson (2018–2020)
Caroline Sjöblom (2021–present)

See also

 Sweden women's national football team
 Sweden women's national under-17 football team
 FIFA U-20 Women's World Cup

References

F
Women's national under-19 association football teams